Perizoma curvilinea is a species of geometrid moth in the family Geometridae. It is found in North America.

The MONA or Hodges number for Perizoma curvilinea is 7324.

References

Further reading

External links

 

Perizoma
Articles created by Qbugbot
Moths described in 1896